Warren Joseph Duffey (January 24, 1886 – July 7, 1936) was an American lawyer and politician from Ohio who was elected to two terms in the United States House of Representatives, serving from 1933 to 1936.

Early life and education
Born in Toledo, Ohio, Duffey attended the public schools.

Duffey graduated from St. John's University in Toledo, Ohio, in 1908 and from the law department of the University of Michigan at Ann Arbor in 1911. Duffey was admitted to the bar the same year and commenced the practice of law in Toledo, Ohio.

Political career
Duffey served in the Ohio House of Representatives in 1913 and 1914 and as a member of the Toledo City Council in 1917 and 1918. He served as chairman of the Lucas County Democratic central committee from 1919 and 1932 and was a delegate to the 1932 Democratic National Convention.

Duffey was elected as a Democrat to the Seventy-third and Seventy-fourth Congresses and served from March 4, 1933, until his death. He was an unsuccessful candidate for renomination in 1936.

Death
Duffey died while in office at the age of 50. He died in Toledo, Ohio on July 7, 1936, and is interred in Calvary Cemetery.

See also
 List of United States Congress members who died in office (1900–49)

Sources

1886 births
1936 deaths
Politicians from Toledo, Ohio
University of Michigan Law School alumni
Ohio lawyers
Democratic Party members of the United States House of Representatives from Ohio
Democratic Party members of the Ohio House of Representatives
20th-century American politicians
Lawyers from Toledo, Ohio
20th-century American lawyers